Charles Edwards (born in Newcastle-upon-Tyne 1965) is an English opera designer and director. He made his directing debut at the Mid-Wales Opera in 2001 with Cosi fan tutte. He is noted for his production of Strauss’s Elektra at the Royal Opera.

References

Opera designers
British opera directors
People from Newcastle upon Tyne
English directors
1965 births
Living people